The Burundian Ambassador to France is the official representative of the Government of Burundi to the Government of France.

List of representatives

References 

 
France
Burundi